Yellur, or Yeloor is a village located just  away from the city of Kollapur in Nagarkurnool district of Telangana, India.  Its total population is more than 3500.

References
Villages in Nagarkurnool district